This is a list of historic places in the Capital Regional District, British Columbia (excluding the City of Victoria) entered on the Canadian Register of Historic Places, whether they are designated federally, provincially or municipally. For a list of historic places in the City of Victoria refer to the List of historic places in Victoria, British Columbia.

References 

(references appear in the table above as external links)

Capital Regional District
Lime kilns in Canada